Isidorus (born c. 139) was a native ancient Egyptian priest in the 2nd century during the Roman rule in Egypt. He led the native Egyptian revolt against Roman rule during the reign of emperor Marcus Aurelius. The likely motivation for the revolt was the uptick in taxes imposed by Aurelius to fund the war in the North.

According to the Roman historian Dio Cassius, Isidorus surpassed all his contemporaries in bravery while leading the Egyptians in this revolt, most often called the Bucolic War. It broke out in 172–173 as a result of oppressive taxation in the Boucolia marshes of the Nile Delta. At first the Egyptians were successful, having defeated the Romans in a pitched battle. After this victory, they almost captured Alexandria, and probably would have taken the city if Avidius Cassius, the governor of Syria, had not been sent against them from the place he governed. Cassius did not dare to attack the rebels while they were united, knowing that they were too numerous and powerful to be defeated; however, he managed to destroy them by separating them from one another. Thus, the rebels were finally subdued only when they fell to quarreling.

The revolt caused great damage to the Egyptian economy and marked the beginning of Egypt's economic decline.

References 

2nd-century births
2nd-century clergy
Egyptian rebels
Ancient Egyptian priests
2nd-century Egyptian people
Year of death unknown
Ancient rebels